The Bucktails (1818–1826) were the faction of the Democratic-Republican Party in New York State opposed to Governor DeWitt Clinton. It was influenced by the Tammany Society. The name derives from a Tammany insignia, a deer's tail worn in the hat. The name was in use as early as 1791 when a bucktail worn on the headgear was adopted as the "official badge" of the Tammany Society. The wearing of the bucktail was said to have been suggested by its appearance in the costume of the Tammany Indians in the vicinity of New York.

The Bucktails were led by Martin Van Buren, and included John King (son of Federalist Rufus King), and William L. Marcy of Troy.  Van Buren and Marcy would later be influential members of the Democratic Party, and Tammany Hall would be a major force in New York Democratic politics for the next century.

References

Adams, James Truslow, Dictionary of American History. New York: Charles Scribner's Sons, 1940

Defunct political parties in the United States
Political parties established in 1818
1818 establishments in New York (state)
Political parties disestablished in 1826
1826 disestablishments in New York (state)